Jack Quinn (born September 19, 2001) is a Canadian professional ice hockey right winger for the  Buffalo Sabres of the National Hockey League (NHL). He was selected eighth overall by the Sabres in the 2020 NHL Entry Draft, where he was projected to be a top prospect.

Playing career
Quinn was selected in the second round, 39th overall, by the Ottawa 67's during the 2017 Ontario Hockey League (OHL) Priority Selection. He spent the majority of the subsequent season with the Kanata Lasers of the Central Canada Hockey League (CCHL) while also appearing in eight games for the 67's. Quinn's rookie season in 2018–19 saw him score 12 goals and 20 assists in 61 games. He also went scoreless in two postseason games. Quinn's draft year was far more productive; he recorded 52 goals and 37 assists for 89 points in 62 games. His goal totals placed him second overall, just three behind Peterborough Petes' forward Nick Robertson.

At the 2020 NHL Entry Draft, Quinn was selected eighth overall by the Buffalo Sabres. On November 16, 2020, he signed a three-year, entry-level contract with the organization.

Due to the 2020–21 OHL season being postponed due to the COVID-19 pandemic, Quinn skated in 15 games for the Sabres' American Hockey League (AHL) affiliate, the Rochester Americans. His year was ended prematurely, however, as he underwent season-ending hernia surgery in late-April. He finished his first professional campaign with two goals and seven assists for the Americans.

On January 11, 2022, Quinn made his NHL debut; he went scoreless in a 6–1 defeat to the Tampa Bay Lightning. Quinn was reassigned to the Americans the following day. On January 20, 2022, Quinn scored his first NHL goal and added an assist in a 5–4 defeat to the Dallas Stars.

Career statistics

Regular season and playoffs

International

Awards and honours

References

External links
 

2001 births
Living people
Buffalo Sabres draft picks
Buffalo Sabres players
Canadian ice hockey forwards
Ice hockey people from Ontario
National Hockey League first-round draft picks
Ottawa 67's players
People from Renfrew County
Rochester Americans players